Robert Kempe (by 1526 – 1571 or later), of Lincoln's Inn, London and Spains Hall, Finchingfield, Essex, was an English politician.

He was a Member (MP) of the Parliament of England for Boroughbridge in 1555.

References

Year of death missing
English MPs 1555
Members of Lincoln's Inn
People from Braintree District
Year of birth uncertain